Panagiotis Poulitsas (Greek: Παναγιώτης Πουλίτσας, 9 September, 1881-16 January, 1968) was a Greek judge and archeologist who briefly served as interim Prime Minister of Greece from 4 April 1946 to 18 April 1946. He was born in Geraki, Laconia on 9 September 1881.

As President of the Council of State, he took the premiership of an interim government from 4 to 18 April 1946 after the troubled 31 March 1946 elections, which were simultaneous with the reigniting of the Greek Civil War.

In 1947, he became a member of the Archaeological Society of Athens and of the Academy of Athens, of which he was elected president in 1954.

He died in Athens on 16 January 1968 at the age of 86.
He was the maternal grandfather of the famous author and playboy Taki Theodoracopulos.

References

External link

1881 births
1968 deaths
20th-century prime ministers of Greece
20th-century archaeologists
Greek Rally politicians
Presidents of the Council of State (Greece)
Prime Ministers of Greece
Greek MPs 1951–1952
People of the Greek Civil War
Members of the Academy of Athens (modern)
National and Kapodistrian University of Athens alumni
People from Laconia
Greek archaeologists